The Uintah meridian, also called the Uintah Special Meridian (USM) has a center point north of Roosevelt, Utah. The Uintah meridian was established in 1875, and governs land surveys in the Uintah and Ouray Indian Reservation in the state of Utah.

References

See also
List of principal and guide meridians and base lines of the United States

External links

Meridians and base lines of the United States
Named meridians
1875 establishments in Utah Territory
Geography of Utah